Henangervatnet is a lake in Bjørnafjorden Municipality in Vestland county, Norway. The lake lies between the lake Skogseidvatnet and the Sævareidfjorden, an arm off the main Bjørnafjorden.

See also
List of lakes in Norway

References

Lakes of Vestland
Bjørnafjorden